Sam Means is an American songwriter, producer and musician, previously songwriter of indie pop band The Format.

Music career 

Sam Means and Nate Ruess left their previous bands Nevergonnascore and This Past Year and formed the indie-pop duo, The Format, in February 2000. The Format announced a hiatus on February 4, 2008.

In the wake of the hiatus, Means and his wife started a company in Phoenix, Arizona called Hello Merch. According to Hello Merch's website, "[the company] started in 2008 as an outlet for bands, musicians, creative artists and businesses to manufacture and sell merchandise anywhere, without giving up their rights." Over the years, Means has extended the Hello brand to other ventures, including an apparel line, a record label, and event space.

On September 29, 2009, Means released the original motion picture soundtrack for the indie film The Sinking of Santa Isabel.

On April 21, 2012, Means released an exclusive 7" for Record Store Day, titled, NONA, on Photo Finish Records. The 7" features an A and B side, with a digital download card for three additional tracks, including a cover of The Hollies', "Carrie Anne".

On April 19, 2014, Means released his second exclusive 7" for Record Store Day, titled, Blue Jeans, on Photo Finish Records. The A Side and title track, "Blue Jeans", is a Lana Del Rey cover, featuring Anthony Green of Circa Survive on lead vocals, with Sizzy Rocket singing back up.

On January 22, 2016, Means released his debut full-length album, 10 Songs on Hello Records. The album reunited Means with his The Format bandmates Don Raymond, Marko Buzzard, Mike Schey, and John O'Riley, along with Dog Problems producer Steven McDonald and arranger Roger Joseph Manning Jr.

The Format reunited for a surprise show on February 3, 2020, performing in Hello Merch's event space. The next day, a brief reunion tour was announced, but would later be delayed due to the COVID-19 pandemic.

On October 12, 2020, Means released a 5-track EP titled, I'm Sorry. Means wrote, "I wrote and recorded a little 5 song EP in my laundry this week, while the girls were out of town." The EP was released digitally and on cassette.

Discography 

For Means' releases with The Format, see The Format discography.

Studio albums

EPs

Various artist compilations

Soundtracks

Features

Singles

References 

American male singer-songwriters
American singer-songwriters
Living people
21st-century American singers
American indie pop musicians
21st-century American male singers
Year of birth missing (living people)
The Format members